Abrorjon Kodirov (uzb. Abrorjon Qodirov Qahramonjon ugli born 11 February 1995 in Kokand, Uzbekistan) is an Uzbek amateur boxer, who fights in bantam-flyweight categories. Kodirov is 2x National champion of Uzbekistan, fighter of Uzbek Tigers (WSB) and bronze medalist of Islamic Solidarity Games that held in Baku, Azerbaijan in 2017.

Tournaments and results 
Konakbayev Tournament 2014 Pavlodar, Kazakhstan 2nd

Golden Valley Tournament 2015 Tashkent, Uzbekistan 1st

Chinggis Khaan-Ulaanbaatar Cup 2016 Mongolia 2nd

Chemiepokal Halle, Germany 2015

Semi-finals: Defeated Beblik Ronny  GER 2:1

Finals: Defeated Konki Elie FRA 2:1

Islamic Solidarity Games 2017 

Round of 16: Defeated Masud Yusifzade	AZE	4:1

Semifanls:  Defeated by Abdelali Darra	MAR 3:2

21st Umakhanov Memorial Tournament Kaspiysk, Russia 2019 - 1st

World series of Boxing, Uzbek Tigers 
Won Ceiber David Avila 3-0 Puerto Rico Hurricans 2016

Lost Yosbany Veitia 0-3 Cuba Domadores 2016

Won Vyacheslav Tashkarakov   3-0 Patriot Boxing Team Russia  2017

Won Chang Yong 3-0 China Dragons 2017

References

External links 

Uzbekistani male boxers
2000 births
Living people